Love You to the Stars and Back is a 2017 Filipino romantic comedy film written and directed by Antoinette Jadaone. Starring Julia Barretto and Joshua Garcia, the film marks their second project together following the 2016 Metro Manila Film Festival entry Vince and Kath and James.

The story conference for the film was held in April 2017  with no working title yet. Production has pushed through in May and it was released on August 30, 2017, to box office success.

Synopsis 
Feeling out of place in her own home, an eccentric and socially awkward girl, Mika (Julia Barretto), decides to go on a road trip with a very strange goal – to look for aliens. In her trip, Mika accidentally bumps into a simple and good-humored boy, Caloy (Joshua Garcia), whom she chooses to give a free ride to until he reaches his destination. Mika is surprised to know that Caloy has cancer. But despite his condition, he has learned to accept his fate and remained positive and joyful.

The two embark on a roadtrip filled with adventures and misadventures, not knowing that it will lead them to experiencing their most memorable romance at such a young age. They unexpectedly teach each other an important lesson on love and life – one that takes most people a lifetime to learn.

Cast

Main Cast 
 Julia Barretto as Mika, An eccentric woman determined to find aliens, believing her place is with them.
 Joshua Garcia as Caloy, A broken child after he was disowned by his father several times. He suffers leukemia thus making him feel like he is a burden to everyone.

Supporting Cast 
 Carmina Villarroel as Michelle, Mika’s mother
 Cherry Pie Picache as Linda, Caloy’s mother
 Ariel Rivera as Ricky, Mika’s father
 Maricar Reyes as Sheryl, Mika’s stepmother
 Edgar Allan Guzman as JP, Caloy’s Elder Brother
 Eda Nolan as Jane, Caloy’s Elder Sister
 Belle Mariano as Ronnabel, Aling Berns’ child. Does not want to go the J.S prom, but was convinced by Mika and Caloy.
 Joaq Reyes as Vincent, Caloy’s younger brother
 Paulo Angeles as Kenneth, Ronnabel’s Crush
 Jelson Bay as Mang Berting, Was accompanied by Mika and Caloy. Until he reached his destination.
 Odette Khan as Doña Leticia, Mang Berting’s future in law
 Ruby Ruiz as Aling Berns, Ronnabel’s mother
 Dr. Philip Niño Tan-Gatue as Doctor

Release 
Love You to the Stars and Back was released on August 30, 2017. The film was graded "B" by the Cinema Evaluation Board of the Philippines. It grossed  on its first week in the cinemas. As of September 16, 2017, the film grossed .

Critical response 
The film received generally positive feedback and glowing reviews from critics. Oggs Cruz of Rappler lauded the film's use of realistic scenes of extended conversations as opposed to very brisk romantic instances. He also praised Garcia's and Barretto's acting, calling them "astute and delightful", respectively. Philbert Dy gave the film 5 out of 5 "tickets", noting that within the first five minutes of the film, you'll know it's not the usual Star Cinema fare, further highlighting the touch of indie filmmaking. He also praised the film's slow build of melodrama and the acting abilities and the chemistry of the lead actors.

References

External links 
 

2017 films
Philippine romantic comedy films
Star Cinema films
Films directed by Antoinette Jadaone